Restriction endonuclease (REase) EcoRII (pronounced "eco R two") is an enzyme of restriction modification system (RM) naturally found in Escherichia coli, a Gram-negative bacteria. Its molecular mass is 45.2 kDa, being composed of 402 amino acids.

Mode of action
EcoRII is a bacterial Type IIE REase that interacts with two or three copies of the pseudopalindromic DNA recognition sequence 5'-CCWGG-3' (W = A or T), one being the actual target of cleavage, the other(s) serving as the allosteric activator(s). EcoRII cuts the target DNA sequence CCWGG, generating sticky ends.

Cut diagram

Structure

The apo crystal structure of  EcoRII mutant R88A has been solved at 2.1 Å resolution. The EcoRII monomer has two domains, N-terminal and C-terminal, linked through a hinge loop.

Effector-binding domain
The N-terminal effector-binding domain has an archetypal DNA-binding pseudobarrel fold with a prominent cleft. Structural superposition showed it is evolutionarily related to:
B3 DNA binding domain from the transcription factors in higher plants
C-terminal domain of restriction endonuclease BfiI

Catalytic domain
The C-terminal catalytic domain has a typical restriction endonuclease-like fold and belongs to the large (more than 30 members) restriction endonuclease superfamily.

Autoinhibition/activation mechanism
Structure-based sequence alignment and site-directed mutagenesis identified the putative PD..D/EXK active sites of the EcoRII catalytic domain dimer that in apo structure are spatially blocked by the N-terminal domains.

See also
EcoRI, another nuclease enzyme from Escherichia coli.
EcoRV, another nuclease enzyme from Escherichia coli.
B3 DNA binding domain from higher plants is evolutionary related to EcoRII
 
FokI, another nuclease enzyme from Flavobacterium okeanokoites

External links
EcoRII in Restriction Enzyme Database REBASE

References

EC 3.1.21
Molecular biology
Bacterial enzymes
Restriction enzymes
EC 3.1
Nucleases